Grainfield Township is a township in Gove County, Kansas, USA.  As of the 2020 census, its population was 406.

Geography
According to the USGS, it contains one cemetery, Grainfield.

References
 USGS Geographic Names Information System (GNIS)

External links
 US-Counties.com
 City-Data.com

Townships in Gove County, Kansas
Townships in Kansas